André Coutte (31 August 1896 – 23 September 1931) was a French racing cyclist. He rode in the 1920 Tour de France.

References

External links
 

1896 births
1931 deaths
French male cyclists
Place of birth missing